The Home Valuation Code of Conduct (HVCC or the 'Code') is an American document created jointly by members of Freddie Mac, the Federal Housing Finance Agency (FHFA), and the New York State Attorney General.

The document states effective May 1, 2009, Freddie Mac will no longer purchase mortgages from Sellers that do not adopt the Code with respect to single-family mortgages that are delivered to Freddie Mac.

Also, effective for single-family mortgages made after May 1, 2009, Freddie Mac Seller/Servicers must represent and warrant that the appraisal report is obtained in a manner consistent with the Code.

Certain types of mortgages are excluded from the Code, including: FHA/VA Mortgages, Section 184 Native American Mortgages, and Section 502 Guaranteed Rural Housing Mortgages.

The code has not been well accepted by the most experienced Real Estate Appraisers as the code eliminated constructive working relationships with lenders and brokers that had been in place and working well for decades in some instances, therefore forcing appraisers to work for Appraisal Management Companies that generally pay only 75% of the fee that was once paid to the appraisers.

For clarity, the code was inserted as a portion of a lawsuit filed by (then) NY Attorney General Andrew Cuomo against Federal Government controlled (owned) FNMA and Freddie Mac. Even though a small part of the entire suit, the AG's office widely publicized that portion. Many who researched the background of the suit came to the same conclusion. It appears the then AG Cuomo was under investigation for unaccountable billions of dollars missing from the coiffures at HUD during his time in charge of the Dept. Soon after the widely publicized HVCC, AG Andrew Cuomo announced plans to run for Governor of New York (Again). Touting the suit and even more so the HVCC made for the perfect political smoke screen. And it worked. With highly questionable activity at HUD, and the prior landslide loss running for the New York Governorship, both of which were extensively publicized, Andrew Cuomo won the New York Governorship.

The HVCC portion of the suit, was written and implemented without challenge. No governmental or professional oversight was utilized to address the potential impact of the HVCC to the 1,000,000+ appraisal industry employees and their families.

A real life illustration as to the impact of the Home Valuation Code of Conduct (HVCC) on the appraisal industry is The Appraisal Corp in Orange County CA. The firm was founded in 1988. In 2006 the firm employed a staff of approximately forty professional and clerical persons. Many of the employees having been with the firm from its beginning. The active client base that supported the firm included hundreds of banks, mortgage lenders, and mortgage brokers. The language of the HVCC forced the firms clients to discontinue doing business with the firm. The firm, many like it, and thousands of employees and their families in the industry were immediately unemployed. To compound the devastation Andrew Cuomo's HVCC caused, all these unemployed professionals found themselves competing for employment (demand) when the supply had become significantly limited. Partially due to the economic cycle, but primarily due to the sudden control of the supply resulting from the HVCC.

References

Mortgage
I agree. Also remove the 1 million + appraisal community. There are only 75,000 appraisers today. I am sure the number was higher in 2008. Maybe 90,000+/- but not 1 M. There is no correlation to the loss of employees to HVCC. The correlation is the loss of employees is a direct result of a market crash.

It was a joint agreement between Fannie Mae, Freddie Mac and OFHEO (now FHFA). Missing money from FHA is BS.